Vladyslav Holopyorov (born 10 October 1983, Soviet Union) is a Ukrainian football striker.

Holopyorov as a product of the Shakhtar Donetsk football academy started out his professional career in the second class teams of Shakhtar in 2000–2006. In 2007-08 he was loaned out to Zorya Luhansk. At the end of the season Holopyorov acknowledged to have been smoking marijuana, because of which he was purged out of Shakhtar Donetsk and received a two-month disqualification.

He tried to recover his playing by playing for amateur FC Slavkhlib Slovyansk and later returned to professional football by signing with FC Zirka Kirovohrad. In 2010-11 Holopyorov played for FC Krymteplytsia Molodizhne in the Ukrainian First League.

External links
 Official Website Profile

1983 births
Living people
Ukrainian footballers
FC Shakhtar-2 Donetsk players
FC Shakhtar-3 Donetsk players
FC Slavkhlib Slovyansk players
FC Zorya Luhansk players
FC Zirka Kropyvnytskyi players
FC Krymteplytsia Molodizhne players
Doping cases in association football
Association football forwards
Sportspeople from Donetsk Oblast